The Victorian Railways X class was a mainline goods locomotive of the 2-8-2 'Mikado' type operated by the Victorian Railways (VR) between 1929 and 1960. They were the most powerful goods locomotive on the VR, aside from the single H class, H220, which was confined to the North East line, until the advent of diesel-electric traction, and operated over the key Bendigo, Wodonga, and Gippsland mainlines.

History
The C class, with a narrow firebox between the frames, could not be easily converted. The X class retained the same cylinder and driving wheel dimensions as the C class as well as its valve gear, but introduced a much larger boiler and a trailing truck behind the rear driving axle.

The 2-8-2 layout of the X class allowed a wide, deep firebox suited to the high ash, low calorific coals from the State Coal Mine typically used for goods haulage. This improved on some key shortcomings of the C class which were regarded as poor steaming and featured a very long  manually stoked firebox that was difficult to fire and prone to clinkering. The X class was also equipped with a much larger capacity tender of similar design to the S class Pacific introduced in 1928, enabling through runs from Melbourne to Bendigo without intermediate stops to restock the tender.

All but two were built with a Franklin C2 type Booster engine on the trailing truck axle, following a successful trial of a booster on the smaller N class light lines 2-8-2. The booster allowed an additional  tractive effort at starting and low speeds to increase the hauling power of the locomotive, particularly on heavy grades. X36 and X37 were built without boosters and were rostered for 'plains working' on the relatively flat line between Gheringhap and Maroona stations. X37 was equipped with a booster in March 1932, however X36 was never fitted with one, even though its trailing truck axle was equipped with the necessary pinion gear wheel.

Production
The success of the original eleven locomotives delivered in 1929 (X27 to X37) led to further examples being built. X38 was assembled in 1937 from spare parts, helping to create work for workshops staff at a time of high unemployment. A further seven X class locomotives were built in 1938, a followed by a further six in 1942–43, with a final four X class delivered by 1947.

Regular service
The X class locomotives were described as always the master of their task, fast steaming and easy riding. With their relatively heavy axle load, the X class was initially confined to the Bendigo and Wodonga lines, with the occasional journey on the Ballarat or Geelong lines. In later years after they were allowed to cross the Flinders Street Viaduct between Spencer Street and Flinders Street stations, they worked goods trains of over 1,000 tons between Morwell and Melbourne, and even worked the South Gippsland line to Korumburra frequently until the late 1950s and as far as Foster.

Even in its original form, the X class locomotive was a marked improvement on the C class in terms of performance. As with the C class, it was also occasionally pressed into mainline passenger service on key intercity routes, particularly during Christmas and Easter peak times.

Design improvements

The X class, in common with all broad gauge VR steam locomotives built from 1907 onwards, underwent design modifications to the smokebox draughting and blastpipe dimensions referred to as 'Modified Front End', as well as other improvements such as the fitting of smoke deflectors, Automatic Staff Exchange apparatus and cross-compound air compressors.  The copper firebox round-top boilers the original eleven locomotives were built with, prone to priming if too much water was carried, were replaced with all-steel boilers featuring Belpaire pattern fireboxes. The new boiler design also featured a combustion chamber and thermic syphons to increase power and efficiency. The VR was so satisfied with the performance of the revised X class all-steel boiler design, a shortened barrel version was considered during the design phase of the R class 4-6-4 express passenger locomotives of 1951.

X38 introduced a new welded fabricated trailing truck in place of the cast steel units previously imported from the Commonwealth Steel Company of Illinois, USA. This design innovation was fitted to all subsequent examples built.

In July 1938, X39 became the first VR locomotive to be equipped with A6-ET brake equipment, a feature subsequently incorporated into all new VR steam locomotives.

Experimental use of Pulverised Brown Coal

In 1949, the VR was faced with dwindling supplies of black coal due to industrial action on NSW coalfields and Victorian black coal reserves becoming exhausted. Large numbers of locomotives were converted to fuel oil operation, but as a further step X32 was experimentally fitted with German 'Stug' (Studiengesellschaft) equipment in a specially modified tender for the burning of Pulverised Brown Coal (PBC), a fuel in potentially abundant supply in Victoria.

The trial was successful with the locomotive noted for its clean running and the elimination of smoke, spark hazard and spark arrestor cleaning. With the grate automatically stoked via a tender-mounted conveyor screw and blower motor, it was now possible to harness the full steam-raising potential of the locomotive's boiler without the stamina of the fireman being a limiting factor. The steam requirements for both engine and booster were able to be met for unlimited periods at maximum steam pressure even against the action of both injectors. The locomotive gained a reputation for both speed and dependability. On one occasion, X32 hauled a  load between Seymour and Melbourne in 105 minutes, where the working timetable for a full  load allowed 147 minutes. On 4 April 1951 it replaced a defective S class locomotive in hauling the Spirit of Progress from Wallan to Melbourne, taking 43 minutes to cover the same distance the S class-hauled train would normally cover in 40 minutes, despite having to start the train from standstill and running with a lower permissible maximum speed.

As early as July 1951 the Victorian Minister for Transport announced that the remaining 28 X class locomotives were to be converted to PBC operation. Victorian Railways went on to convert express passenger locomotive R707 to PBC operation and went as far as placing tenders for the construction of a further 15 new brown-coal fired X class locomotives. However, by 1957 the price of PBC had doubled against a fall in the price of fuel oil and the increased availability of high quality NSW coal at good prices. This, coupled with the demonstrated efficiency and economical operation of B class mainline diesel-electric locomotives introduced in 1952, made the high cost of installing storage and transport facilities for PBC uneconomic. The additional X class order had already been cancelled in favour of additional B class locomotives, and in January 1957 Victorian Railways announced the discontinuation of PBC operation and the intention to return X32 and R707 to black coal firing. X32, taken out of service in May 1956 pending repairs, was instead scrapped in August 1957.

Demise
The rapid dieselisation and electrification of Victorian Railways' mainline operations in the 1950s meant that the X class was rendered obsolete as the new B class diesel-electrics and L class electrics proved their superiority over steam for heavy freight work. Withdrawals commenced in 1957 and accelerated with the delivery of the S class diesel-electric locomotives from August that year, with the diesel fleet by then large enough for the X class to be displaced from mainline goods haulage. A report comparing total operating costs per mile (including fuel, oil, crewing, maintenance, depreciation and interest) for locomotives in freight service found an S class diesel-electric cost 68.41 pence per mile versus 261.01 pence per mile for the X class steam locomotive. The X class locomotives were increasingly relegated to short-hop transfer goods haulage, a role that as mainline goods locomotives they were unsuitable for. On 12 April 1957 X43 became the first of the class to be scrapped, and by the end of 1960 all were withdrawn and all but one had been scrapped.

Preservation

Efforts by railway enthusiasts to save the last remaining X class locomotive from being scrapped played a pivotal role in the establishment of a railway museum and the preservation of examples of many other VR locomotive classes.

In September 1960, the VR announced that the remaining X, D1, D2, D4, E and Y class locomotives were to be withdrawn within the next six months. Members of the Australian Railway Historical Society (ARHS) and a number of VR employees, aware that these locomotive classes were about to vanish just as the S class had six years earlier, began making approaches to the Victorian Railway Commissioners suggesting that an example of each of the various classes still in existence be preserved in a railway museum. On 17 November, the last two X class locomotives in service were withdrawn, and X36 hauled X29 dead-attached back to Newport Workshops where both were to be scrapped. By the end of the year X29 was already largely cut up, and VR employees sympathetic to preservation efforts had moved X36 to the back of the scrapping row to buy it time as negotiations continued over its future. In February 1961 the ARHS met with the VR and succeeded in securing a temporary hold on X36's scrapping until 1 April 1961. When that date passed without resolution, X36 was again moved back to the scrapping row. However, the locomotive was saved when the office of the VR Chief Mechanical Engineer intervened at the eleventh hour and deferred the scrapping.

In May 1961, the VR Commissioners accepted the ARHS proposal for the museum and provided locomotives, land, and tracks for its establishment. The Railway Museum opened to the public on 10 November 1962 and X36, withdrawn after  of service, is today preserved alongside dozens of other former VR locomotives and rolling stock.

In April 2006, the boiler from scrapped locomotive X30, obtained by CSR Limited in 1959 to provide steam for Australia's first particle board factory in Oberon, New South Wales, was finally retired from service after 47 years service and allocated to a preservation group.

Model Railways

HO scale
Steam Era Models has produced a brass and whitemetal kit for the X Class steam locomotive, items L10E for 1929–1935, L10R and L10W for the 1945–1962 period riveted and welded tenders respectively, with numbers included for X28, 29, 33, 35, 36, 38, 39, 46, 50 and 51. Alternative parts are also included for fabricated or cast trailing trucks (under the cab), plate or lattice cowcatchers.

Trainbuilder will soon release a ready-to-run brass model of the engine, featuring numbers X28, 29, 42, 49, 51 and 55; X32 with Stug equipment, and X36 as preserved.

References

Specific

External links
X class locomotive history and photographs
VPRS 12800/P1 H 1015 - PUBLIC RECORD OFFICE VICTORIA Steam locomotive X32, as built with original round-top boiler and prior to modifications for PBC firing
VPRS 12800/P1 H 1543 - PUBLIC RECORD OFFICE VICTORIA Photograph of X class locomotive hauling goods train across viaduct from Spencer Street to Flinders Street stations, Melbourne
VPRS 12800/P1 H 5074 - PUBLIC RECORD OFFICE VICTORIA X29, hauling freight
VPRS 12800/P4 RS 0324 - PUBLIC RECORD OFFICE VICTORIA Detail photograph of X class trailing truck and booster engine frame
VPRS 12903/P1 Box 298/05 - PUBLIC RECORD OFFICE VICTORIA Diagram of booster engine as fitted to X class locomotive
- PUBLIC RECORD OFFICE VICTORIA Schematic diagram of booster engine operation
VPRS 12903/P1 Box 454/10 - PUBLIC RECORD OFFICE VICTORIA Steam locomotive X32 being refuelled with brown coal dust, North Melbourne
VPRS 12903/P1 Box 496/02 - PUBLIC RECORD OFFICE VICTORIA Dynamometer car test results showing theoretical speeds (in mph) up various grades for locomotive X 32 running on Yallourn brown coal precipitator dust.  Note additional low speed increments below line indicating use of booster engine

Railway locomotives introduced in 1929
X class
2-8-2 locomotives
Broad gauge locomotives in Australia